Wacław Bolesław Marzantowicz  is a Polish mathematician known for his contributions in number theory and topology. He was President of the Polish Mathematical Society from 2014 to 2019.

Biography 
In 1967 he became the finalist of the 18th Mathematical Olympiad. In 1972, he graduated in mathematics at Adam Mickiewicz University in Poznań. He obtained his doctorate in Institute of Mathematics of the Polish Academy of Sciences in 1977, based on the work Lefschetz Numbers of Maps Commuting with an Action of a Group written under the direction Kazimierz Gęba. He got habilitation there in 1991, based on the work Invariant topology methods used in variational problems.

From 1993 to 1996, he was the director of the Institute of Mathematics University of Gdańsk. Since 1996, he has been working at Faculty of Mathematics and Computer Science at the Adam Mickiewicz University in Poznań, where he heads the Department of Geometry and Topology. In 2002 he received the title of professor of mathematics. References to his papers can be found in mathematical databases.

From 1993 to 1996, he was the president of the Gdańsk Branch of the Polish Mathematical Society (PMS) and then its vice president (2011–2013). Since 2014, he has been the president of the Polish Mathematical Society.

Further reading
 Jerzy Jezierski; Wacław Marzantowicz, Homotopy methods in topological fixed and periodic points theory. Topological Fixed Point Theory and Its Applications, 3.
 Złota księga nauk ekonomicznych, prawnych i ścisłych 2005, wyd. Gliwice 2005, p. 205

References

1950 births
Living people
Number theorists
Polish mathematicians